The American toad (Anaxyrus americanus) is a common species of toad found throughout Canada and the eastern United States. It is divided into three subspecies: the eastern American toad (A. a. americanus), the dwarf American toad (A. a. charlesmithi) and the rare Hudson Bay toad (A. a. copei). Recent taxonomic treatments place this species in the genus Anaxyrus instead of Bufo.

Tadpoles

The eggs of the American toad are laid in two strings and can hatch in 2–14 days. When hatched the tadpoles are recognizable by their skinny tails in relation to the size of their black bodies. They may advance to adulthood in 50–65 days. When metamorphosis is completed, the "toadlets" may stay in the water for a short period of time before they become mostly land based. Often entire groups of tadpoles reach the toadlet stage at once and a mass migration to higher ground takes place usually to shaded areas of mid range and upland forests bordering the marshes from where they bred. Toadlets can be observed eating microscopic bugs as fast as they can in the ground area they roam between various vegetation; they are also known to eat ants, spiders, slugs and worms. Studies have shown that they have a mutualistic relationship with Chlorogonium algae, which makes tadpoles develop faster than normal.

Tadpoles have several mechanisms to reduce predation. They avoid predators by swimming in very shallow water often with thick grass vegetation, and by swimming close together in schools during the day. Tadpoles also produce toxic chemicals in their skin that discourage some potential predators. Fish have been reported to die after consuming one tadpole; however, most fish quickly learn to avoid eating American toad tadpoles. The tadpoles are also very small and they are a solid black color.

Biogeography
Based on DNA sequence comparisons, Anaxyrus americanus and other North American species of Anaxyrus are thought to be descended from an invasion of toads from South America prior to the formation of the Isthmus of Panama land bridge, presumably by means of rafting.

Subspecies
Races tend to hybridize with Anaxyrus woodhousii in their overlapping ranges.

Eastern American toad

 
The color and pattern is somewhat variable, especially for the females. Skin color can change depending on habitat colors, humidity, stress, and temperature. Color changes range from yellow to brown to black, from solid colors to speckled. Their breeding habits are very similar to Anaxyrus fowleri. The call or voice of a breeding male is a high trill, lasting 6–30 seconds, similar to a ringing telephone. They hibernate during the winter. The eastern American toad has spots that contain only one to two warts. It also has enlarged warts on the tibia or lower leg below the knee. While the belly is usually spotted, in some areas many are, and it is generally more so on the forward half (in some rare individuals there may be few or no spots). This subspecies of the American toad has no or very little markings on it. The spades on the back legs are blackish. Some toads of this subspecies have a more pervasive red and deep brown color, many with red warts on their bodies. Also eastern American toads have parotoid glands that are the same color as the surrounding skin. The glands don't usually have any patterning on them.

Other species that may be confused with the eastern American toad are Fowler's toad, which has three or more warts in the largest dark spots, and in the far west of its range woodhouse's toad. Fowler's toad can be especially difficult to identify in comparison to the eastern American toad but one difference is that it never has a spotted belly and both cranial crests touch the parotoid glands. Also, Fowler's toads are very fast hoppers (bursts of 5–10 fast hops) in comparison to Eastern toads lethargic, casual hopping and walking locomotion. In the eastern American toad these crests almost never touch the parotoid glands, which secrete bufotoxin, a poisonous substance meant to make the toad unpalatable to potential predators. Bufotoxin is a mild poison in comparison to that of other poisonous toads and frogs, but it can irritate human eyes and mucous membranes and is dangerous to smaller animals (such as dogs) when ingested.

American toads require a semi-permanent freshwater pond or pool with shallow water in which to breed, to gather their water supplies in times of drought or as a routine, and for their early development. They also require dense patches of vegetation, for cover and hunting grounds. Given these two things and a supply of insects for food, American toads can live almost everywhere, ranging from forests to flat grassland. Females when caught are silent and easily tamed, adapting to terrarium life readily, while the smaller males are readily communicative. The smaller males do not adapt well to terrarium life and should be released after a few days of observation. Adult toads are mostly nocturnal, although juveniles are often abroad by day. When it rains, these toads will become active and can be observed eating robustly worms and insects leaving their burrows and walking in front of an opportunist toad. These toads are 'creatures of habit' once they have a certain area they prefer to live within... an acre of wooded forest with water in proximity for soaking, a home with cool ledges and window wells; they commonly seek cover in burrows, under boardwalks, flat stones, boards, logs, wood piles, or other cover. When cold weather comes, these toads dig backwards and bury themselves in the dirt of their summer homes, or they may choose another site in which to hibernate. Their diet includes crickets, mealworms, earthworms, ants, spiders, slugs, centipedes, moths, and other small invertebrates. Some of these toads have been known to live over 30 years and currently a female specimen (over 13 centimeters long) is living healthily into her late 30s. Another female toad of 17 centimeters is known to have existed in Wisconsin from Washington Island on Lake Michigan.

The eastern American toad may be confused with the Canadian toad in the area where they overlap, but the cranial crests in the American toad do not join to form a raised "boss" (bump) like they do in the Canadian toad. Its range also overlaps with the southern toad's, but in this species the cranial crests form two unique knobs.

Dwarf American toad
The spots on the back are reduced or absent, and when present they contain a few small red warts and a black ring around it like in the normal American toad. The warts are always darker than the skin of the toad. Some specimens have a white dorsal line in the middle of their backs. The ventral surface or belly is usually cream colored with a few dark spots in the breast area. This subspecies can be distinguished from the above-mentioned species in the same manner as for the eastern American toad. The southwestern portion of the Dwarf American toad's range overlaps with that of the Gulf Coast toad. The latter species is distinguished by the presence of a dark lateral stripe as well as a deep "valley" between its prominent cranial crests. It eats mainly spiders, worms and small insects.

Hudson Bay toad
The Hudson Bay toad (A. a. copei) is a rare Canadian subspecies of A. americanus. This subspecies of the American toad has been seen in the northern parts of Ontario where there are a few isolated populations. These northern dwarf toads mostly have the red coloring on the sides of their bodies and have an unusually high number of warts for the subspecies. Interbreeding with eastern American toads caused this subspecies to lose the red coloring on their backs.

Inbreeding avoidance
Toads display breeding site fidelity, as do many other amphibians. Individuals that return to natal ponds to breed will likely encounter siblings as potential mates. Although incest is possible, Anaxyrus americanus siblings rarely mate. These toads likely recognize and actively avoid close kins as mates. Advertisement vocalizations by males appear to serve as cues by which females recognize their kin.

Gallery

See also
European toad
European green toad
Japanese toad

References

External links

 B. americanus at the United States Geological Survey site
 USDA – Bufo americanus – United States Department of Agriculture Integrated Taxonomic Information System''.
Animal Diversity Web: Bufo americanus
Photograph and audio recording of male American toad

Anaxyrus
Amphibians of the United States
Amphibians of Canada
Fauna of the Eastern United States
Fauna of the Great Lakes region (North America)
Amphibians described in 1836
Taxa named by John Edwards Holbrook